Bernières-sur-Seine (literally Bernières on Seine) is a former commune in the Eure department in Normandy in northern France. On 1 January 2017, it was merged into the new commune Les Trois Lacs.

Population

See also
Communes of the Eure department

References

Former communes of Eure